USS Preston was a blockade-running steamer originally named Annie that was captured by the Union Navy during the American Civil War.

She was placed in service on the Gulf of Mexico by the Union Navy as a gunboat during blockade operations against the Confederate States of America.

Service history 

She was purchased by the Navy from the New York City Prize Court in December 1864 and was renamed Preston on 2 February 1865. The ship was commissioned on 6 February 1865, Acting Volunteer Lt. J. R. Wheeler in command. Assigned to the West Gulf Blockading Squadron, Preston departed New York City on 16 February and arrived at New Orleans, Louisiana on 9 March. She operated along the Texas coast into July and on the 25th was ordered to Philadelphia, Pennsylvania. Decommissioned in Philadelphia on 8 August 1865, she was sent to New York City in November and sold at auction on the 30th.

See also

Blockade runners of the American Civil War
Blockade mail of the Confederacy

References 

Ships of the Union Navy
Steamships of the United States Navy
Gunboats of the United States Navy
American Civil War patrol vessels of the United States